Windwaker may refer to:

 The Legend of Zelda: The Wind Waker, a 2002 video game
 Windwaker (band), an Australian metalcore band